Israel participated in the Eurovision Song Contest 1998 with the song "Diva" performed by Dana International. The song was written by Svika Pick and Yoav Ginai.

The Israeli entry for the 1998 contest in Birmingham, UK was announced on 23 November 1997, having been selected internally by an expert committee assembled by the country's public broadcasting service IBA.

Before Eurovision

Internal selection 
15 songs were submitted by the public, which were subsequently evaluated by a special committee that selected the Israeli entry for 1998 contest. On 23 November 1997, IBA announced that Dana International was selected as the Israeli representative for the Eurovision Song Contest 1998 with the song "Diva". Among entries considered by the selection committee, "Shir Tikva" performed by Arkadi Duchin and Halimonim was highly considered before Dana International was ultimately selected.

At Eurovision 
Heading into the final of the contest, BBC reported that bookmakers ranked the entry joint 6th out of the 25 entries. Israel was drawn to compete eighth in the contest, held on 9 May, 1998. At the end of the night, the nation placed 1st in the field of 25 entries, receiving 172 points.

Voting

Congratulations: 50 Years of the Eurovision Song Contest

"Diva" was one of fourteen Eurovision songs selected by fans to participate in the Congratulations 50th anniversary show in 2005. It was both the only entry from the '90s and the only Israeli entry to appear in the main competition. The song was drawn to perform third, following "What's Another Year?" by Johnny Logan and preceding "Eres tú" by Mocedades. Like the other acts that night, "Diva" was represented by dancers performing alongside footage of Dana International's original performance from 1998, with Dana herself appearing to lip-sync to the ending of the song and introduce the next act. She would appear later in the show to perform an English version of Baccara's "Parlez-vous français?" during a medley of Eurovision favorites.

At the end of the first round, "Diva" was not among the five songs proceeding to the final round. It was later revealed that "Diva" finished thirteenth with 39 points. It received a sole 12 points from Israel themselves, who (unlike in standard Eurovision editions) were allowed to vote for their own entry.

Voting

Notes

References

1998
Countries in the Eurovision Song Contest 1998
Eurovision